Castle Horneck is a Grade II* listed building, and refurbished Georgian mansion to the west of the Cornish town of Penzance. It is currently owned by the Youth Hostels Association (YHA) and has been used as a youth hostel since 1950.

Toponymy
Castle Horneck derives from Castelhornek in a 1335 manuscript and Kestel Hornek from a 1395 manuscript.

History
Also referred to as Castle Hornocke (Early Modern English) and Iron Castle; it may be the site of a castle, which may have existed, near Penzance. Castle Horneck is said to have been built by the Tyes family in the 12th century, and in the 13th and 14th centuries the Tyes were the Lords of the Manor of Alverton. The first mention of Penzance is in 1284 and the Manor of Alverton was influential in the history and development of the town. In the early 16th-century Thomas Lavelis of Castle Horneck, inherited Trewoofe (near Lamorna) when he married Joanna, the youngest daughter of John de Trewoofe. Castle Horneck is the ancient home of the Borlase family, and in circa 1720 the front of the house was rebuilt by Dr Walter Borlase. In the 1860s the Borlase family were listed as one of two major landholders in the parish of Morvah and by 1893 the Misses Borlase were the ladies of the manor at Morvah.

The house was modernised in 1879 with larger windows on the front of the house and annexes built on the east and north. At that time there was extensive grounds with good specimens of giant redwood (Sequoiadendron giganteum) and the largest hollies (Ilex aquifolium) in the neighbourhood. In April 1880 the house was leased to the Reverend Franklyn Tonkin, the vicar of Madron. When the house was leased in 1880, William Copeland Borlase who was born at Castle Horneck in 1848 was living at nearby Laregan House.

References

External links

 Cornish dictionary − hornek = Cornish for iron, ferric 

Buildings and structures completed in the 12th century
Buildings and structures in Penzance
Castles in Cornwall
Former buildings and structures in Cornwall
Former castles in England
Grade II* listed buildings in Cornwall
Houses in Cornwall
Youth hostels in England and Wales
Grade II* listed houses